Henry Eben Burnham (November 8, 1844February 8, 1917) was a United States senator from New Hampshire. Born in Dunbarton, New Hampshire, he attended the public schools and Kimball Union Academy and married Hannah Elizabeth Patterson. Burnham graduated from Dartmouth College in 1865, studied law, was admitted to the bar in 1868 and commenced practice in Manchester. He engaged in banking and insurance and was member of the New Hampshire House of Representatives in 1873-1874, was treasurer of Hillsborough County from 1875 to 1877, was judge of probate for Hillsborough County from 1876 to 1879, and was a member of the State constitutional convention of 1889. He was chairman of the Republican State convention in 1888, served as a ballot-law commissioner from 1892 to 1900, and was elected as a Republican to the U.S. Senate in 1901.

Burnham was reelected to the Senate in 1907 and served from March 4, 1901, to March 3, 1913; he was not a candidate for reelection. While in the Senate he was chairman of the Committee on Cuban Relations (Fifty-eighth through Sixtieth Congresses) and a member of the Committee on Claims (Sixty-first Congress) and the Committee on Agriculture and Forestry (Sixty-second Congress). He resumed the practice of law and died in Manchester, 1917; interment was in Pine Grove Cemetery.

References

1844 births
1917 deaths
Dartmouth College alumni
New Hampshire state court judges
Republican Party members of the New Hampshire House of Representatives
Republican Party United States senators from New Hampshire
People from Dunbarton, New Hampshire
19th-century American judges